The 2008–09 season was Olympiacos's 50th consecutive season in the Super League Greece and their 83rd year in existence. The club are competing in the UEFA Cup after an 11-year participation in the UEFA Champions League, as they were eliminated in the UEFA Champions League third qualifying round by Anorthosis. In the beginning of the summertime, Olympiacos unveiled Spanish Ernesto Valverde as their new coach.

Squad

 Under 20s

  Under 20s

Summer squad changes

In:

 loan return from AEL 1964
  from Real Zaragoza
  from Portuguesa
  from CSKA Moscow
  from Aris
  loan from Liverpool
 from Iraklis
 from Apollon Kalamarias

Total spending:  €23.8 million 

Out:

 Released and moved to Dinamo Zagreb

 Released
  moved to Independiente
  moved to Al-Arabi

Total income:  €5.5 million

Out on loan

 to Leicester City
 to OFI
  to Levadiakos

Current national players 

 34 (1)
 84 (3)
 4 (0)
 2 (0)
 3 (0)
 20 (1)
 9 (2)
 13 (3)

Appearances (goals)

Competitions

Overall

Super League Greece

Classification

Results summary

Results by round

Matches
All times at EET

Greek Cup

Fourth round

Fifth round

Quarter-finals

Semi-finals

Final

UEFA Champions League

All times at CET

Third qualifying round

UEFA Cup

All times at CET

First round

Group stage

Round of 32

Team kit

References

External links 
 Official Website of Olympiacos Piraeus 

Olympiacos F.C. seasons
Olympiacos F.C.
Greek football championship-winning seasons